Michele Austin is a British actress best known for her role as PC Yvonne Hemmingway on ITV's The Bill, for which she won the Screen Nation award for best television actress in 2005.

Early life and career
She studied acting at Rose Bruford College in Sidcup. As well as her role as PC Hemmingway in the ITV series The Bill, she played the character Marsha Harris twice in 2001. Austin had roles in Mike Leigh's films Secrets & Lies (1996) and Another Year (2010). She also has a small role in ITV's 2008 teen drama Britannia High as Mrs Doris Troy, the landlady of the main characters, in the comedy Never Better and as a nurse in BBC's Outnumbered that aired on 30 August 2009.

In December 2010, she appeared in the British BBC soap opera EastEnders as Gloria MacDonald, a role which she reprised in February 2016. Prior to this she played Miss Meg Tyler in 1993. On 12 February 2013 she played the part of Estelle in an episode of Death in Paradise on BBC1.

In 2016, she appeared in the BBC series The Coroner.

In 2020, she appeared in the British comedy TV series Meet the Richardsons.

In 2022, she played senior midwife Tracy in the BBC screen adaptation of Adam Kay'''s book based on his experiences as a junior doctor, This Is Going To Hurt''.

Filmography

Film

Television

References

External links
 

Alumni of Rose Bruford College
British actresses
Living people
Year of birth missing (living people)
Black British actresses
English people of Jamaican descent